Nripatindravarman II

Biography 
It is possible that Harshavarman III was succeeded  by a king named
Nripatindravarman who reigned  in Angkor until 1113 and that Jayavarman VI never reigned there.

In fact Suryavarman II claimed to have seized power from two kings; one was his uncle Dharanindravarman I of which there is no inscription in Angkor; the other can only be Nripatindravarman.

Bibliography

References

11th-century Cambodian monarchs
Khmer Empire
Hindu monarchs
Cambodian Hindus
12th-century Cambodian monarchs